Yusuf Sari (born 20 November 1998) is a Turkish professional footballer who plays as a winger for Turkish Süper Lig club Adana Demirspor.

Club career

Marseille
Sari made his professional debut for Marseille in a 2–0 Ligue 1 win over Toulouse FC on 24 September 2017.

He also made two appearances as right-winger domestic cup. One against SAS Epinal and another against Bourg-en-Bresse, where he obtained a penalty kick at the end of the game. The penalty kick was scored by his teammate Clinton N'Jie.

Clermont (loan)
On 29 August 2018, Sari was loaned to Ligue 2 side Clermont Foot until the end of the season.
But he come back to Marseille in January 2019.

Trabzonspor
Sari did not get enough chances at Marseille and decided to move to Turkish Süper Lig club Trabzonspor. The deal was confirmed on 18 June 2019 where he signed a 3-year contract.

Adana Demirspor
On 31 May 2022, Adana Demirspor signed Sari to a 3 year contract.

International career
Sari was born in France and is of Turkish descent. He debuted for the Turkey U21s in a 3–0 2019 UEFA European Under-21 Championship qualification loss to the Sweden U21s on 23 March 2018.

Honours
Trabzonspor
Turkish Cup (1): 2019–20
Turkish Super Cup (1): 2020

Career statistics

Club

References

External links

OM Profile
OM1899 Profile
TFF Profile

1998 births
Living people
People from Martigues
Sportspeople from Bouches-du-Rhône
Association football wingers
Turkish footballers
Turkey youth international footballers
French footballers
French people of Turkish descent
Olympique de Marseille players
Clermont Foot players
Trabzonspor footballers
Çaykur Rizespor footballers
Ligue 1 players
Ligue 2 players
Süper Lig players
Footballers from Provence-Alpes-Côte d'Azur